Chalcosoma chiron (often called the Caucasus beetle) is a species of beetle in the family Scarabaeidae. This species can be found from Malaysia south into Indonesia (Sumatra, Java, Malay Peninsula, Indochina) and Thailand in East region (Chanthaburi province,  Sa Kaeo province). It was formerly known as Chalcosoma caucasus, a name which is a junior synonym and not valid.

Description
Caucasus beetles are the largest of the genus Chalcosoma and one of Asia's largest beetles. They have a striking sexual dimorphism. The male has specialised enormous, curved horns on its head and thorax that it can use to fight with  other males to gain mating rights with females. A female is significantly smaller. The elytra of the females have a velvety texture, as they are covered by tiny hairs. When males enter into contests for females, the fighting spirit is as strong as in the Hercules beetle of South America. Because they can be captured throughout the year, the acquisition of these beetles is easy and the price is quite low. Caucasus beetles differ from Atlas beetles (for which they are often mistaken) in that they have a small tooth on their lower horns.

Their grubs go through three molts, and generally live underground for 12–15 months; the larger males remain grubs longer than females. Their pupae live 1–2 months, while the adults live for 3–5 months. Females live longer than males.

Subspecies
C. c. belangeri - Thailand, Langkawi, Vietnam
C. c. chiron - Java
C. c. kirbyi - West Malaysia
C. c. janssensi - Sumatra

References

Dynastinae
Insects of Indonesia
Insects of Malaysia
Beetles described in 1789